The 2017 St. Petersburg Open was a tennis tournament played on indoor hard courts. It was the 22nd edition of the St. Petersburg Open, and part of the ATP World Tour 250 Series of the 2017 ATP World Tour. It took place at the Sibur Arena in Saint Petersburg, Russia, from September 18 through 24, 2017.

Singles main-draw entrants

Seeds

 1 Rankings are as of September 11, 2017

Other entrants
The following players received wildcards into the singles main draw:
  Evgeny Donskoy
  Jo-Wilfried Tsonga
  Evgenii Tiurnev
The following player received entry using a protected ranking:
  Ričardas Berankis
The following players received entry from the qualifying draw:
  Liam Broady
  Ernests Gulbis 
  Daniel Masur
  John-Patrick Smith
The following player received entry as a lucky loser:
  Radu Albot

Withdrawals
Before the tournament
  Aljaž Bedene →replaced by  Thomas Fabbiano
  Federico Delbonis →replaced by  Mikhail Youzhny
  Kyle Edmund →replaced by  Guido Pella
  Leonardo Mayer →replaced by  Damir Džumhur
  Gaël Monfils →replaced by  Marcos Baghdatis
  Janko Tipsarević →replaced by  Ričardas Berankis
  Jiří Veselý →replaced by  Radu Albot

During the tournament
  Philipp Kohlschreiber

Doubles main-draw entrants

Seeds

 Rankings are as of September 11, 2017

Other entrants
The following pairs received wildcards into the doubles main draw:
  Evgeny Donskoy /  Mikhail Youzhny
  Mikhail Elgin /  Alexander Kudryavtsev

Finals

Singles

  Damir Džumhur defeated  Fabio Fognini, 3–6, 6–4, 6–2

Doubles

   Roman Jebavý /  Matwé Middelkoop defeated  Julio Peralta /  Horacio Zeballos, 6–4, 6–4.

External links
Official website

St. Petersburg Open
St Petersburg Open
St Petersburg Open
St. Petersburg Open